The Daguao River is a river of Puerto Rico. Its source is in Chupacallos barrio in Ceiba and Naguabo, Puerto Rico.

See also
List of rivers of Puerto Rico

References

External links
 USGS Hydrologic Unit Map – Caribbean Region (1974)

Rivers of Puerto Rico